Indian Institute of Information Technology, Agartala is one among the 20 IIITs established under the non-profit Public-Private Partnership (PPP) model. It is presently functioning inside the campus of NIT Agartala until the construction of a 52-acre permanent campus in Bodhjungnagarat near Agartala is completed.

History 
The project to establish IIIT Agartala was approved in 2012. In 2020, the institute was granted Institute of National Importance tag.

References

Agartala
Universities and colleges in Tripura
Engineering colleges in Tripura
Science and technology in Tripura
Educational institutions established in 2019
2019 establishments in Tripura